Tiffany Hyden (born September 4, 1980) is an American former ice dancer. Hyden was born in Long Beach, California. From 1999–2002 she competed with Vazgen Azrojan for Armenia. They competed at two European Championships and the 2000 World Championships. Hyden is now a real estate agent in Colorado.

Results

With Azrojan

Earlier partnerships

Programs 
(with Azrojan)

References

External links 
 

American female ice dancers
Armenian female ice dancers
1980 births
Living people
Sportspeople from Long Beach, California
21st-century American women